Steven Eli Friedman (born 31 March 1953) is a South African academic, newspaper columnist, intellectual, activist, former trade unionist and journalist. He holds a doctorate in Literature from Rhodes University (2007) and directs the Centre for the Study of Democracy, a joint project by Rhodes University and the University of Johannesburg. His book Building Tomorrow Today: African Workers in Trade Unions 1970-1984 has been described as a classic South African text. He has written opinion pieces for Thought Leader and The New Age and currently writes a weekly column for Business Day.

He is also a strong supporter of rights for Palestinians and a proponent of a one state solution in Israel and Palestine. He was appointed the National Head of the Independent Electoral Commission's Information Analysis Department during preparations for South Africa's 1994 election.

He is the father of Daniel Friedman, a musical comedian known on stage as Deep Fried Man.

Books

References

External links
 Staff profile at the University of Johannesburg
 Steven Friedman SA History Online
 Who's Who SA: Steven Friedman

Academic staff of the University of Johannesburg
South African activists
South African trade unionists
South African Jews
Living people
Academic staff of Rhodes University
1953 births
South African journalists